Prosím, pane profesore is a 1940 Czechoslovak film. The film starred Josef Kemr.

References

External links
 

1940 films
1940s Czech-language films
Czech drama films
Czechoslovak black-and-white films
1940s Czech films
Czechoslovak drama films
Czech black-and-white films